Walter Franklin "Walt" Bashore (October 6, 1909 – September 26, 1984), born Walter Franklin Beshore, was a Major League Baseball outfielder. Bashore played for the Philadelphia Phillies in the  season. In 10 career games, he had 2 hits in 10 at-bats. He batted and threw right-handed.

Bashore was born in Harrisburg, Pennsylvania and died in Sebring, Florida.

External links

1909 births
1984 deaths
Philadelphia Phillies players
Major League Baseball outfielders
Baseball players from Harrisburg, Pennsylvania
People from Sebring, Florida